Carina Rosenvinge Christiansen (born 17 March 1991) is a Danish recurve archer who competed at the 2012 Summer Olympics.

Early and personal life
Christiansen was born on 17 March 1991 in Aalborg. She was introduced to archery at the age of eleven in 2002, joining the Aarhus Archer's Guild (Aarhus Bueskyttelaug), the club with which she has remained as of 2015. In 2012 she listed tennis player Caroline Wozniacki as her sporting idol.

Career

2012 Summer Olympics
Christiansen made her Olympic debut at the 2012 Summer Olympics in London, joining teammates Maja Jager and Louise Laursen for Denmark's first appearance in the women's team event, as well as competing in the women's individual event. The preliminary ranking round, which determined the seedings for the subsequent elimination rounds, saw Christiansen rank seventh for the individual competition with 663 points from a maximum of 720, while Christiansen, Jager, and Laursen's combined score for the team event set a new Danish national record of 1,946 points to finish with the eighth seed. The trio defeated India in the first knock-out round to advance to the quarter-finals, where they were defeated by South Korea.  

In the women's individual event Christiansen progressed the furthest of her teammates, reaching to the last sixteen before being eliminated by Mexico's Mariana Avitia.

References

External links

Danish female archers
1991 births
Living people
Olympic archers of Denmark
Archers at the 2012 Summer Olympics
Sportspeople from Aalborg
Archers at the 2015 European Games
European Games competitors for Denmark
World Archery Championships medalists
21st-century Danish women